Daniely Ríos Mora is a Puerto Rican table tennis player. As of January 2020, she has been in position 214th with 1660 points in the ITTF Women's World Ranking. In 2019, in collaboration with Adriana Díaz and Melanie Díaz, she was instrumental in earning a gold medal for Puerto Rico's female team in the Pan American Games in Lima. Women's Paraguay Open 2019 was her last international match where she “caused arguably the biggest upset of the day by beating Ilka Doval.”

Personal life
Ríos Mora was raised in Utuado, Puerto Rico. She was trained by Víctor Pimentel and Bladimir Díaz in the Águilas de la Montaña table tennis club, and has been playing since she was five. In pairs and teams, Ríos has played with the Díaz sisters in various international competitions. In May 2020, Daniely earned her bachelor's degree in mass communications from the Ana G. Méndez University; she is also interested in attending law school.

See also

Latin American Youth Table Tennis Championships
Puerto Rico at the 2019 Pan American Games
Melanie Díaz
Adriana Díaz
Brian Afanador
Bruna Takahashi
Jennifer Wu
Lily Zhang
Caroline Kumahara

References

External links 
  Daniely Rios’ record at Table Tennis Guide
  Daniely Rios’ record at Los Deportes

Puerto Rican table tennis players
1996 births
Living people
People from Utuado, Puerto Rico
Pan American Games bronze medalists for Puerto Rico
Pan American Games medalists in table tennis
Table tennis players at the 2019 Pan American Games
Medalists at the 2019 Pan American Games